The women's team pursuit competition of the cycling events at the 2011 Pan American Games will be held on October 18 at the Pan American Velodrome in Guadalajara. This will be the first time this event is held at the Pan American Games.

Schedule
All times are Central Standard Time (UTC−6).

Results
8 teams of three competitors competed. The top two teams will race for gold, while third and fourth race for the bronze medals.

Qualification

Finals

References

Track cycling at the 2011 Pan American Games
Women's team pursuit (track cycling)
Pan